Wiesław Buż (born 27 September 1957) is a Polish politician and sociologist. Member of the Sejm representing Democratic Left Alliance (SLD) and the New Left (after SLD merged with Spring into a new party in 2021).

Electoral history

References

1957 births
Living people
People from Rzeszów
Democratic Left Alliance politicians
Members of the Polish Sejm 2019–2023